Hu Chen-pu (born 14 August 1948) is a Taiwanese politician and retired general officer. He was the 1st Commander of the Republic of China Army, 11th Minister of the Veterans Affairs Commission (VAC) of the Executive Yuan and 1st Commander of the Republic of China Army (ROCA).

Verdict
On 30 September 2011, Hu was found guilty of corruption by the Taipei District Court. He was sentenced for ten years in prison and his civil rights was deprived for three years. He secured a total of NT$1.4 million from RPTL International and other companies in which the VAC had invested.

References

Living people
1948 births
Taiwanese Ministers of the Veterans Affairs Council
Taiwanese politicians convicted of corruption
Taiwanese people from Jiangsu